Annales de Paléontologie is a peer-reviewed scientific journal covering paleontology. It is published by Elsevier.

According to the Journal Citation Reports, its 2020 impact factor is 0.702. The journal is abstracted and indexed in BIOSIS Previews, PASCAL, FRANCIS, and Scopus.

, the editor-in-chief is Didier Neraudeau.

References 

English-language journals
Online-only journals
Earth and atmospheric sciences journals